Melikumud (also, Melikumu) is a village in the Kurdamir Rayon of Azerbaijan.

References 

Populated places in Kurdamir District